George Peacock (1791–1858) was an English mathematician and Anglican cleric.

George Peacock may also refer to:
 George Peacock (manufacturer) (1824–1900), Australian businessman
 George Peacock (footballer) (1881–1943), Australian rules footballer

See also
 Peacock (disambiguation)
 George Peacocke (1821–1879), British politician

English-language names